Safiabad Rural District is a rural district (dehestan) in Bam and Safiabad District, Esfarayen County, North Khorasan Province, Iran. At the 2006 census, its population was 7,683, in 1,882 families.  The rural district has 23 villages.

References 

Rural Districts of North Khorasan Province
Esfarayen County